National Cycle Network (NCN) Route 167 is a Sustrans regional route in the Yorkshire Wolds between Kirkham and Huggate. It is one of 5 NCN routes that make up the 146 mile Yorkshire Wolds Cycle Route. Created in 2011 it is fully open and signed.

Route 

The entire route is on road, along quiet country lanes. The north western end is at Kirkham, where is joins the western end of NCN 166. It passes through the villages of Westow, Leavening and Thixendale on its way to its south eastern end at Huggate. Here it meets the northern section of NCN 164.

The Yorkshire Wolds is a rolling landscape, there are very few flat sections in this route.

The steepest gradients are the climbs out of Leavening and Thixendale when cycling towards Huggate.

Sustrans aims to extend the route north to Malton and Pickering.

Related NCN Routes 

Route 167 meets the following routes:
166 at Kirkham 
164 at Huggate 

NCN 167 is part of the Yorkshire Wolds Cycle Route with:

References

External links 
 National Route 167 on the Sustrans website.

Cycleways in England
Cycling in Yorkshire
Yorkshire Wolds